Anna Gornostaj (born February 23, 1960, born Warsaw, Poland) is a Polish actress. She appeared in the  television series Aby do świtu... in 1992.

References

External links

Polish actresses
1960 births
Living people